Shenzhen Metro Line 3 (formerly branded as Longgang line), runs northeastward from  to . Line 3 opened on 28 December 2010.

Since opening, it has been heavily trafficked and became a major transport option for urban workers. Line 3 currently has a service interval of 5 minutes between trains across the entire length of the line. Sectional trains operate on weekdays, between Huaxin and Tangkeng, from 7:15 am to 9:15 am and from 5:45 pm to 7:45 pm.

History
The first phase of Shenzhen Metro Line 3 started construction in July 2007. On 23 April 2008, the Shenzhen Municipal Planning Bureau renamed the still under construction Shenzhen Metro Line 3 to "Longgang Line". The renaming was later reverted in 2013.

First stage 
This section is almost entirely elevated except near . It starts from Longgang District and runs mainly along Shenhui Road, to Luohu District.

Second stage 

Third stage 

Future development
With the start of Shenzhen Metro's Phase IV construction, Line 3 will be extended on eastern end.

Eastern extension
A  eastern extension to Pingdi Liulian station (further into Longgang District) is under construction.

Long term plans
Long term plans include extending Line 3 even further east into neighboring Huizhou City along with Line 12. On 7 August 2013 a "Memorandum of Cooperation" was signed to coordinate transport planning and urban development between the two cities, formalizing the planning process for the proposal.

Service routes
  —  (Before 11:00 PM)
  —  (Working days peak hours only)
 Some train services from Futian Bonded Area to Tangkeng (usually at peak hours and 11:00 PM to 11:30 PM).
 Some train services from Shuanglong to Huaxin (usually at peak hours and 11:00 PM to 11:30 PM).

Stations

Rolling stock

References

Shenzhen Metro lines
Railway lines opened in 2010